Francis Edwardes was a British MP.

Francis Edwardes may also refer to:

Sir Francis Edwardes, 2nd Baronet (1643–1690), of the Edwardes baronets
Sir Francis Edwardes, 3rd Baronet (died 1701), of the Edwardes baronets
Sir Francis Edwardes, 4th Baronet (1699–1734), of the Edwardes baronets

See also
Francis Edwards (disambiguation)